Intria may refer to:

Intria Items, a Canadian payment and information processing services company part of CIBC bank.
INTRIA (Nazi Germany), International Trade and Investment Agency in Nazi Germany